Gambling Hangover was the theme of an Australian social marketing campaign to help young male gamblers.

The campaign
The two-year campaign was created by Sydney agency The Campaign Palace on behalf of the Responsible Gambling Fund, a part of the New South Wales Office of Liquor, Gaming and Racing.

It targeted men aged 18–25 in the "morning after" phase following a gambling binge, when they were most likely to seek help for problem gambling. It identified the three main symptoms of a gambling hangover as "a sick feeling," "anxiety and regrets," and "not liking yourself."

Ads were placed where young men were likely to see them in the morning: in train stations, on buses, on morning radio, and in morning newspapers. Young men were urged to visit gamblinghangover.nsw.gov.au, to SMS for more information, or to call a helpline number if they recognised the gambling hangover symptoms in themselves.

Responses to the helpline and in follow-up research showed the phrase had moved into common usage among young men, and 50 percent of those surveyed were able to recall the campaign.

See also
Gambling in Australia

References

External links
https://web.archive.org/web/20081120041851/http://www.missionaustralia.com.au/news/media-releases/556-young-men-encouraged-end-gambling-hangover

Gambling in Australia
Advertising campaigns
Australian advertising slogans
2008 neologisms
Problem gambling organizations